Rugigegat nigra is a moth in the family Cossidae. It was described by Frederic Moore in 1877. It is found in Sri Lanka.

References

Zeuzerinae
Moths described in 1877